Maculabatis is a genus of stingrays in the family Dasyatidae from the Indo-Pacific. Its species were formerly contained within the genus Himantura.

Species
The genus contains two groups, the "gerrardi-complex" containing spotted species and the "pastinacoides-complex" containing plain species.
Maculabatis ambigua Last, Bogorodsky & Alpermann, 2016 (Baraka's whipray)
Maculabatis arabica Manjaji-Matsumoto & Last, 2016 (Pakistan whipray)
Maculabatis astra (Last, Manjaji-Matsumoto & Pogonoski, 2008) (Black-spotted whipray)
Maculabatis bineeshi Manjaji-Matsumoto & Last, 2016 (Short-tail whipray)
Maculabatis gerrardi (Gray, 1851) (Whitespotted whipray)
Maculabatis macrura (Bleeker, 1852)
Maculabatis pastinacoides (Bleeker, 1852) (Round whipray)
Maculabatis randalli (Last, Manjaji-Matsumoto & A. B. M. Moore, 2012) (Arabian banded whipray)
Maculabatis toshi (Whitley, 1939) (Brown whipray)

References

Dasyatidae
 
Taxa named by Peter R. Last
Taxa named by Gavin J.P. Naylor
Taxa named by Bernadette Mabel Manjaji-Matsumoto